Meltek Sato Kilman Livtuvanu (born 30 December 1957) is a Vanuatuan politician. He was Prime Minister of Vanuatu on four occasions, most recently from June 2015 to February 2016. Kilman was previously Prime Minister from December 2010 to April 2011 and from May to June 2011, though his premiership was subsequently annulled by a court of law.

He was elected Prime Minister again on 26 June 2011, thus beginning his first legally recognised term in the premiership; he served until 23 March 2013. He is also the current Leader of the People's Progress Party. He is an MP from Lakatoro on Malekula Island.

Career
Kilman and Ham Lini led the opposition to the Serge Vohor government when it took office in July 2004. Soon, however, Lini joined a coalition government with Vohor. Kilman then became known as the leader of the opposition, and became a particularly strong critic of Vohor's attempts to establish relations with Taiwan. In December 2004, Kilman filed the no confidence motion which deposed Vohor and made Lini prime minister. In the new cabinet established on 13 December 2004, Kilman was rewarded by becoming Lini's deputy, as well as taking the position of foreign minister.

Kilman was dismissed from the government in a cabinet reshuffle in late July 2007. According to the government, this was due to alleged fraud, involving money stolen from the government, in which Kilman's political secretary was said to be involved.

Following the 2008 general election, the People's Progress Party was in Opposition, as part of the Alliance bloc. In March 2009, Kilman was named leader of the Opposition, because the Alliance bloc had the largest number of seats of any Opposition party or alliance. In November 2009, however, during a major Cabinet reshuffle, Kilman was brought into Natapei's government as deputy Prime Minister.

On 2 December 2010 Kilman was appointed Prime Minister after Edward Natapei was ousted in a vote of no confidence. Kilman was himself narrowly ousted in a vote of no confidence on 24 April 2011 (Easter Sunday), by twenty-six votes to twenty-five; Serge Vohor succeeded him.

Vohor's election was declared invalid on 13 May 2011, as he only had a relative majority, and not an absolute one.

On 16 June, however, Chief Justice Vincent Lunabek ruled in a separate case put forward by Edward Natapei, contesting the constitutionality of Kilman's initial election in December 2010. Lunabek ruled that Kilman's election to office had indeed been unconstitutional, as "[t]he speaker of Parliament Maxime Carlot Korman [had] appointed Mr Kilman prime minister without following article 41 of the constitution which required he be elected by secret ballot". Kilman's premiership was annulled, and Natapei was restored as interim Prime Minister, instructed to convene Parliament for the election of a new Prime Minister. Ironically, as Natapei's ministers were restored as interim ministers, Kilman reverted to being Natapei's interim deputy prime minister - a position he was expected to hold only for a few days.

On 26 June, Kilman stood for the premiership, and was elected by Parliament, with 29 votes to Serge Vohor's 23.

He retained the confidence of Parliament following the October 2012 general election, forming a broad coalition government.

On 20 March 2013, Minister for Justice and Social Welfare Thomas Laken and Minister for Ni-Vanuatu Business Marcellino Pipite crossed the floor to join the Opposition, along with six government backbenchers. Lacking a majority with which to govern, Kilman announced his resignation the following day, before a motion of no confidence could be brought against him. On 23 March, Parliament elected Moana Carcasses Kalosil to succeed him.

On 15 May 2014, Carcasses was ousted in a motion of no confidence. New Prime Minister Joe Natuman appointed Kilman his Minister for Foreign Affairs and Trade. In early June 2015, Natuman sacked him for having said publicly that he could support a motion of no confidence against the government.

On 11 June 2015, Kilman again became Prime Minister. He ousted Joe Natuman through a no-confidence vote, having been sacked as Foreign Minister by Natuman the previous week.

In October 2015, half of the MPs in Kilman's government, including Deputy Prime Minister Moana Carcasses and several other ministers, were imprisoned for bribery. Kilman refused to comment publicly during the case, and allowed convicted MPs to remain in their positions as government ministers right up until the point of their imprisonment. His perceived lack of leadership during the crisis, and refusal to take responsibility for corruption within his government, was widely criticised and led to calls for his resignation.

References

External links

Statement by Sato Kilman at the 61st session of the United Nations General Assembly, 26 September 2006

|-

|-

|-

1957 births
Foreign Ministers of Vanuatu
Living people
Members of the Parliament of Vanuatu
People from Malampa Province
People's Progressive Party (Vanuatu) politicians
Prime Ministers of Vanuatu